Meleh Sorkheh (also known as Meleh Sūkhteh and Milleh Surkha) is a village in Razan Rural District, Zagheh District, Khorramabad County, Lorestan Province, Iran. At the 2006 census, its population was 27, in 7 families.

References 

Towns and villages in Khorramabad County